Olga Algertovna Volozhinskaya (born 18 May 1962) is a former ice dancer who competed for the Soviet Union. With Alexander Svinin, she is the 1983 European silver medalist, 1985 Skate Canada International champion, and competed at the 1984 Winter Olympics in Sarajevo.

Personal life 
Volozhinskaya was born on 18 May 1962 in Tallinn. She married Russian figure skater Sergey Petrovskiy, with whom she has two sons, Nikita and Anton.

Career 
Volozhinskaya competed with Alexander Svinin for the Soviet Union. Winners of the 1980 Grand Prix International St. Gervais, they made their senior ISU Championship debut later that season at the 1981 World Championships, placing fifth. Volozhinskaya/Svinin were fourth at the 1982 European Championships and sixth at the 1982 World Championships. Their best international results came the next year — silver at the 1983 European Championships and fourth at the 1983 World Championships.

Volozhinskaya/Svinin placed fifth at the 1984 European Championships and were assigned to the 1984 Winter Olympics where they placed seventh. Although no longer sent to ISU Championships, they competed for two more seasons, winning gold at the 1984 Skate Canada International, bronze at the 1984 Prize of Moscow News, and silver at the 1985 Skate Canada International. After retiring from competition, they performed in ice shows in England and the United States.

Volozhinskaya is now a choreographer, based in Florida. Her clients have included Alena Leonova, Stacey Pensgen, Daniel Samohin, and Maria Vigalova / Egor Zakroev.

Results 
with Svinin

References 

Soviet female ice dancers
Olympic figure skaters of the Soviet Union
Figure skaters at the 1984 Winter Olympics
Living people
Figure skaters from Tallinn
1962 births
European Figure Skating Championships medalists
Estonian people of Russian descent